Ferdinand Becherer (born 7 June 1963 in Konstanz, Baden-Württemberg) is a German ice dancer. With his twin sister Antonia Becherer, he was a three-time German national champion. They placed 9th at the 1988 Winter Olympics. They represented the club Konstanzer ERC.

Results
(with Antonia Becherer)

References
 
 ISU statistics

1963 births
Living people
German male ice dancers
Figure skaters at the 1988 Winter Olympics
Olympic figure skaters of West Germany
People from Konstanz
Sportspeople from Freiburg (region)